Manuel Jorge de Elías (born June 5, 1939) is a Mexican composer and conductor. He initially studied under his father, composer Alfonso de Elías, and then studied under Marie and Karlheinz Stockhausen. He was the founder of the Music Institute at the University of Veracruz, which was established in 1975. In 1988, he founded the Jalisco Philharmonic Orchestra. He directed the Las Rosas Conservatory in Morelian in 1990-91. In 1992 he was awarded the National Prize for Arts and Sciences of Mexico.

He has produced 175 scores. Many of his works make use of serialism and images or graphics in the scores. His Mictlán-Tlatelolco was dedicated to the victims of the 1985 earthquake in Mexico City.

He conducted the premiere of Alex Panamá's guitar concerto, Destellos de una Vida.

Selected works
Concierto de cámara for Viola, Percussion and String Orchestra (1992)
Elegía for Viola and Piano (1962)
Vitral 1 for chamber orchestra
Vitral 3 for Orchestra
Divertimento for Drum kit
Aphorismus 1 for Choir a capella
Aphorismus 3 for solo Flute
Preludio (Pieza de cámara No.1) for Viola Solo (1962)
Preludio for Viola Solo (1976)
Sonate 1 for Piano
Sonate 2 for Piano
Sonate 3 for Trumpet, trombone, and horn
Sonate 4 for Orchestra

References
Ricardo Miranda-Perez. "Manuel de Elias". The New Grove Dictionary of Music and Musicians online.

External links
Academia de Artes

Mexican male classical composers
Mexican classical composers
1939 births
Living people